Amiri Yadav (born 13 July 1959) is a Nepalese long-distance runner. He competed in the marathon at the 1984 Summer Olympics.

References

External links
 

1959 births
Living people
Athletes (track and field) at the 1984 Summer Olympics
Nepalese male long-distance runners
Nepalese male marathon runners
Olympic athletes of Nepal
Place of birth missing (living people)